Stenalia biskrensis is a beetle in the genus Stenalia of the family Mordellidae. It was described in 1903.

References

biskrensis
Beetles described in 1903